Cassagnoles is the name or part of the name of several communes in France:

 Cassagnoles, in the Gard department
 Cassagnoles, in the Hérault department